The IKEA effect is a cognitive bias in which consumers place a disproportionately high value on products they partially created. The name refers to Swedish manufacturer and furniture retailer IKEA, which sells many items of furniture that require assembly.

A 2011 study found that subjects were willing to pay 63% more for furniture they had assembled themselves than for equivalent pre-assembled items.

History and background
The IKEA effect was identified and named by Michael I. Norton of Harvard Business School, Daniel Mochon of Yale, and Dan Ariely of Duke, who published the results of three studies in 2011. They described the IKEA effect as "labor alone can be sufficient to induce greater liking for the fruits of one's labor: even constructing a standardized bureau, an arduous, solitary task, can lead people to overvalue their (often poorly constructed) creations."

Norton, Mochon, and Ariely cited other researchers' previous work on "effort justification" which had demonstrated that the more effort someone put into something, the more someone will value it. This phenomenon had been observed by Leon Festinger (1957) and in realms ranging from psychotherapy (Axsom & Cooper, 1985) and brainwashing (Schein, 1956).

Product designers were familiar with the IKEA effect long before it was given a name. Norton and his colleagues noted that, while not yet named or scientifically established, it had been recognized by marketers for a long time. Norton and his fellow researchers cited the Build-a-Bear product, which allows people to make their own teddy bears. Many consumers enjoy this option, even though they are charged a high price for a product for which, thanks to their labor, the manufacturer does not have to pay production costs. In addition, the researchers pointed out the popularity of "haycations," whereby city people pay to do farmers' work for them. In all these cases, the researchers posit, people seem more willing to pay for an item into which they have put a degree of their own labor.

The researchers pointed out that as a result of earlier consumer psychology studies that essentially pointed to the existence of the IKEA effect, many firms transitioned from viewing consumers as "recipients of value" to instead "co-creators of value." One element of this shift was the involvement of consumers in product design, marketing, and testing.

A 1959 study by Aronson and Mills that has been described as a "classic" produced results that seem to reflect either the IKEA effect or a closely related phenomenon. Female participants were required to undergo "no initiation, a mild initiation, or severe initiation" before entering a discussion group. The women's later appraisal of the group's value was proportional to the effort that had been demanded of them before being allowed into the group.

Citing other researchers' work demonstrating "a fundamental human need for effectance – an ability to successfully produce desired outcomes in one's environment," Norton et al. argued that "one means by which people accomplish this goal is by affecting and controlling objects and possessions." They placed special emphasis on Bandura's "seminal" 1977 study showing that "successful completion of tasks" was a "crucial means by which people can meet their goal to feel competent and in control."

Experiments by Norton et al.
Norton and his colleagues conducted research to find out if consumers would pay higher prices for products that required self-assembly. The research consisted of three different experiments in which the participants built Lego items, folded origami figures and assembled IKEA boxes.

In the first part of the experiment, part of the subjects were given the task of assembling IKEA furniture, while others were allowed to examine a pre-built version of the same furniture. Researchers then asked the participants to price the items. The results showed that the subjects who built the furniture were willing to pay 63% more than the ones who were given pre-built furniture.

In a second part of the experiment, researchers asked subjects to make either origami frogs or cranes, following a provided instruction sheet. They then asked the subjects how much they were willing to pay for their own work. Researchers then gathered another group of subjects who had not taken part in the origami creation. The new subjects were asked how much they were willing to pay for an origami built by the participants. Following this, the researchers displayed origami made by experts to another set of non-builders and asked them how much they were willing to pay for it. It was found that the builders were willing to pay about 5 times more for their own creation than the non-builders were, as expected from the first part of the experiment. When asked how much somebody else would pay for their origami, the builders also gave a high price to their work, showing that they actually think that the origami has a high value. The second set of non-builders were willing to pay for the well-crafted origami about as much as the builders were willing to pay for their origami.

The third and final experiment involved two sets of subjects. The first set were told to completely assemble a piece of IKEA furniture. The second set were also instructed to assemble a piece of IKEA furniture, but only partially. Both groups then took part in bidding over these objects. Results showed that individuals who had built the box completely were willing to pay more than the individuals who had only partially built an item.

Conclusions by Norton et al.
The experiments by Norton and his colleagues demonstrated that self-assembly affects the evaluation of a product by its consumers. The results suggest that when people construct a particular product themselves, even if they do a poor job of it, they value the end result more than if they had not put any effort into its creation.

Participants, wrote Norton and his colleagues, "saw their amateurish creations as similar in value to experts' creations, and expected others to share their opinions." To be sure, "labor leads to love only when labor results in successful completion of tasks; when participants built and then destroyed their creations, or failed to complete them, the IKEA effect dissipated." The researchers also concluded "that labor increases valuation for both 'do-it-yourselfers' and novices."

The researchers noted that their use of "simple IKEA boxes and Lego sets that did not permit customization" did not prevent participants from manifesting the IKEA effect.

Later research
Gibbs and Drolet (2003) showed that raising consumers' energy levels can persuade them to select experiences that involve greater effort. But companies have been warned not to challenge consumers too much, lest they be unable to complete a task and thus end up dissatisfied.

Research by Dahl and Moreau (2007) suggests that customers are more satisfied when there is a limit to the amount of creativity they can express in assembling a product.

Causes
One factor is that "self-assembly of products may allow people to both feel competent and display evidence of that competence." Also, the idea that they are "saving money by buying products that require some assembly" may make them feel like "smart shoppers."

Other possible explanations for the IKEA effect have been suggested, such as "a focus on the product's positive attributes, and the relationship between effort and liking." The IKEA effect is one of several cognitive biases that seem to reflect a causative link between perceived effort and valuation.

The work by Norton et al. demonstrated that participants' valuing of products was not caused by ownership of them or by "greater time spent touching them."

Examples
The IKEA effect is thought to contribute to the sunk costs effect, which occurs when managers continue to devote resources to sometimes failing projects they have invested their labor in. The effect is also related to the "not invented here" syndrome, where managers disregard good ideas developed elsewhere, in favor of (possibly inferior) internally developed ideas.

Writer Tyler Tervooren realized that he was witnessing an example of the IKEA effect when he toured a house that was for sale at a price that was "at least $30,000 too much" and discovered that the reason why the owner overvalued the house so dramatically was that she had "had the home built herself and customized every aspect of it to her taste." But while she regarded the house as "a masterpiece," Tervooren "saw a house like any other but with paint colors I'd never choose." Tervooren realized that he, too, had fallen victim to the IKEA effect on various occasions: "I had a special bond with my old car because I always worked on it myself. And when my iPhone broke down last year, I pulled it apart and learned to fix it so I could keep using it."

The IKEA effect may be said to manifest itself in situations when programmers have been invited to help (without payment) in creating open-source programs and operating systems, such as Linux.

Animals
The IKEA effect has also been observed in animals, such as rats and starlings, which prefer to obtain food from sources that required effort on their part (Kacelnik & Marsh, 2002; Lawrence & Festinger, 1962).

Business
Tervooren has advised business owners that they "can reap massive rewards by putting the IKEA effect to work for your customers. Whenever you can, let them customize the products and services you offer to fit their needs. Make them feel like their own creativity and effort went into getting what they need from you. They'll pay more for it."

A Forbes 2012 article counseled marketers that "if your customers put your product together, they'll like it more" but added that "an assembly process that is clear and free of frustration is essential."

Computer app designers have been advised to take advantage of the IKEA effect by providing "sample data, pre-filled defaults, and editable templates to help make your app feel animated with content and connections, and alive to users. Then use email triggers, prompts, and guidance to get people to interact with that content — even if it's just to move a card around on a board or reply to an email. This helps to lower the fear and frustration of dealing with a new product while increasing capabilities." The manufacturers of such computer products as Wistia, Basecamp, and iDoneThis have been guided by the IKEA effect in introducing them to the public.

Consumers
Norton and his colleagues warned that the IKEA effect could lead people to overvalue their own belongings when offering them for sale. For example, "people may see the improvements they have made to their homes—such as the brick walkways they laid by hand—as increasing the value of the house far more than buyers, who see only a shoddily-built walkway."

On the other hand, a 2012 article in Psychology Today suggested that "if you're having a hard time deciding between buying something pre-built or putting it together yourself, the extra work that might not seem worth it now might very well put a smile on your face when it's all done. Saving yourself the labor could just cost you some happiness."

See also
 Dunning–Kruger effect
 Effort justification
 Escalation of commitment
 Omission bias
 Pygmalion effect

References

External links

  Contains an interview with Daniel Mochon.
 

Cognitive biases
Cognition
2011 introductions
IKEA